Polonnaruwa District is one of the 25 districts of Sri Lanka, the second level administrative division of the country. It is also one of the two districts of North Central Province and has an area of 3,293 km2.

The district is administered by a District Secretariat headed by a District Secretary (previously known as a Government Agent) appointed by the central government of Sri Lanka. The capital of the district is the city of Polonnaruwa.

Administrative Units

Demographics

Ethnicity
The majority of the population are Sinhalese with a minority Sri Lankan Moor and Sri Lankan Tamil population.

Religion

According to the 2011 census 89.7% of the population were Buddhists, 7.5% Muslim, 1.7% Hindu and 1% Christian.

Politics and government

Local government

Education

Following are some of the schools in the Polonnaruwa District.

 Royal Central College, Polonnaruwa
 Thopawewa National School, Polonnaruwa
 Polonnaruwa Muslim Central College,Kaduruwela
 Ananda Balika National School, Hingurakgoda
 Minneriya National School, Minneriya
 Medirigiriya National School, Medirigiriya
 Diulankadawala Central College, Diulankadawala
 Mahasen National School, Bakamuna
 Vilayaya Nationala School, Aralaganwila
 Polonnaruwa Sungavil Muslim Maha Vidyalaya

Towns

 Kaduruwela
 Hingurakgoda
 Minneriya
 Bakamuna
 Aralaganwila
 Medirigiriya
 Giritale
 Elahera
 Jayantipura
 Galamuna
 Lankapura
 Sungavila
 Manampitiya
 Siripura
 Welikanda
 Dimbulagala
 Thambala
 Pulastigama

References

 
Districts of Sri Lanka